German submarine U-571 was a Type VIIC U-boat built for the Kriegsmarine of Nazi Germany for service during World War II. U-571 conducted eleven war patrols, sinking five ships totalling , and damaging one other for 11,394 GRT. On 28 January 1944 she was attacked by an Australian-crewed Sunderland aircraft from No. 461 Squadron RAAF west of Ireland and was destroyed by depth charges. All hands were lost.

Design
German Type VIIC submarines were preceded by the shorter Type VIIB submarines. U-571 had a displacement of  when at the surface and  while submerged. She had two shafts and two  propellers.

U-571 was fitted with five  torpedo tubes (four fitted at the bow and one at the stern), fourteen torpedoes, one  SK C/35 naval gun, 220 rounds, and a  C/30 anti-aircraft gun. The boat had a complement of between forty-four and sixty.

Service history

Her keel was laid down on 8 June 1940 by Blohm & Voss of Hamburg. She was commissioned on 22 May 1941 with Kapitänleutnant Helmut Möhlmann in command. Under his command U-571 had nine successful patrols in the Arctic and in the North and Central Atlantic. In August and September 1941, U-571 operated against Allied and Soviet forces, damaging the Soviet passenger vessel Marija Uljanova on 26 August.

In 1942, U-571 operated off the east coast of the United States, sinking the British cargo ship  on 29 March, the Norwegian tanker M/T Koll on 6 April off Cape Hatteras, and the American freighter Margaret on April 14 after the ship left San Juan, Puerto Rico. Although U-571’s log mentions that some of the 8 officers and 21 men managed to get into a lifeboat and onto rafts, none of Margaret’s crew was ever seen again. In July 1942 the submarine operated in the Caribbean and torpedoed four ships: the British freighter Umtata on 7 July, the American tanker, J. A. Moffett, Jr. on 8 July, the Honduran freighter Nicholas Cuneo on 9 July and on 15 July the American tanker, Pennsylvania Sun.

The whole crew of J. A. Moffett, Jr. (35 merchant marine and 5 Naval Armed Guard) abandoned ship into two lifeboats and three rafts, except for the master who was killed. The United States Coast Guard vessels Mary Jean and Southbound picked up the 39 survivors and brought them to Florida. Pennsylvania Sun was later salvaged and returned to service, while the other three ships attacked in July were sunk.

On 22 March 1943, U-571 was attacked by an aircraft in the North Atlantic and was damaged and had to return to base. In April 1943, Möhlmann claimed that he sank three additional ships but these could not be matched with records of Allied losses. On 22 April 1943, she had to return to base because the commander was badly injured in an accident on the conning tower. On 2 May 1943, Möhlmann was relieved by Oberleutnant zur See Gustav Lüssow. U-571 patrolled off the west coast of Africa in July before returning to base on 1 September. Between September and December, U-571 was probably being overhauled in a drydock as no mention of the boat for that time period appears in war diary kept by the German Commander in Chief, Submarines, Admiral Karl Dönitz. 

On 18 January 1944, Lüssow reported to his submarine command that he attacked and sank an unknown destroyer. This could not, however, be identified with any known Allied losses during World War II.

Fate
On 28 January 1944 she was attacked by an Australian-crewed Sunderland aircraft from No. 461 Squadron RAAF west of Ireland and was destroyed by depth charges. The aircraft's captain, Flight Lieutenant R. D. Lucas, reported that most of the crew successfully abandoned ship, but soon died from hypothermia. A dinghy was dropped but failed to open. U-571 sank with all hands52 deadat . She had not, until her loss, suffered any casualties to her crew during her entire career. The plane, EK577 (callsign "D for Dog"), was crewed partly by Royal Air Force (RAF) personnel and was based at RAF Pembroke Dock, in Wales. The crew was Lucas, Sergeant (Sgt) J. R. Brannan (RAF, a Canadian), Flight Sergeant (F/Sgt) W. J. Darcey, Sgt D. Musson (RAF), F/Sgt S. T. Burnett, Sgt D. McWalker (RAF), Flying Officer (F/O) H. D. Roberts, F/Sgt G. H. Simmonds (RAF), F/O R. H. Prentice, and F/Sgt C. D. Bremner.

Wolfpacks
U-571 took part in 14 wolfpacks, namely:
 Stosstrupp (30 October – 4 November 1941) 
 Raubritter (4 – 17 November 1941) 
 Störtebecker (17 – 22 November 1941) 
 Seydlitz (27 December 1941 – 16 January 1942) 
 Endrass (12 – 17 June 1942) 
 Panther (10 – 20 October 1942) 
 Veilchen (20 October – 7 November 1942) 
 Delphin (26 December 1942 – 19 January 1943) 
 Landsknecht (19 – 28 January 1943) 
 Without name (27 – 30 March 1943) 
 Adler (7 – 13 April 1943) 
 Meise (13 – 25 April 1943) 
 Rügen (15 – 26 January 1944) 
 Hinein (26 – 28 January 1944)

Summary of raiding history

References

Bibliography

External links

German Type VIIC submarines
U-boats commissioned in 1941
U-boats sunk in 1944
World War II submarines of Germany
World War II shipwrecks in the Atlantic Ocean
1941 ships
Ships built in Hamburg
U-boats sunk by Australian aircraft
U-boats sunk by depth charges
Shipwrecks of Ireland
Ships lost with all hands
Maritime incidents in January 1944